A Band Is Born is a 1952 album by the arranger and composer Billy May.

Reception
The Billboard magazine review from April 20, 1957, upon the album's reissue commented that "dealers can expect many buys from fans who favor the distinctive May style".

Track listing
 "Charmaine" (Erno Rapee, Lew Pollack)
 "Lean, Baby" (Billy May)
 "Unforgettable" (Irving Gordon)
 "Fat Man Boogie" (May)
 "There Is No Greater Love" (Isham Jones, Marty Symes)
 "I Guess I'll Have to Change My Plan" (Arthur Schwartz, Howard Dietz)
 "Mayhem" (May)
 "When My Sugar Walks Down the Street" (Gene Austin, Irving Mills, Jimmy McHugh)
Tracks on 1957 reissue:
 "All of Me" (Gerald Marks, Seymour Simons)
 "My Silent Love" (Edward Heyman, Dana Suesse)
 "Lulu's Back In Town" (Al Dubin, Harry Warren)
 "If I Had You" (Jimmy Campbell, Reginald Connelly, Ted Shapiro)

Personnel
Billy May – arranger
Alvin Stoller – vocals on "Fat Man Boogie"

References

External links

1952 albums
Albums arranged by Billy May
Billy May albums
Capitol Records albums
Instrumental albums